Borne Sulinowo  is a town in north-western Poland, within the West Pomeranian Voivodeship. It is a capital of a separate gmina (municipality). As of June 2021, the town has a population of 5,008; the surrounding commune is inhabited by additional 4,772 people. It is situated on the southern shore of Pile Lake in the region of Pomerania.

The town is notable for the fact that between 1945 and 1992 it was a secret Soviet military base that did not appear on any map, and was only transferred to Polish control in October 1992.

History
The town of Borne Sulinowo traces back its roots to two distinct villages founded in the area in the 16th century by local Pomeranian nobility. Modern town occupies the place of the village of Linden (linden tree), which in 1590 had 12 inhabitants. A nearby village named Großborn was home to 14 peasants.

Both villages developed very slowly. In the late 19th century, the area of the village of Linde was bought by the Prussian government and converted into a military training ground. However, it was not until the advent of Nazism in Germany that changes really arrived there.

World War I and interbellum
During World War I, there was an outcamp of the Schneidemuhl (Piła) German prisoner-of-war camp at Gross Born.

In 1933 the new German authorities bought all of the area and started the construction of a large military base, a training ground and various testing grounds there. Most of the local inhabitants were resettled and their homes razed to the ground. In place of the village of Linde, a small military garrison and a town was built. Paradoxically, it was given the name of the nearby village of Gross Born (which was also levelled), despite the fact that the actual namesake was located several kilometres to the south-east. All facilities were officially opened by Adolf Hitler on August 18, 1938. Soon afterwards the Artillery School of the Wehrmacht was moved there. Shortly before the outbreak of the joint German-Soviet invasion of Poland, which started World War II in 1939, the training grounds housed Heinz Guderian's XIX Army Corps. During the later stages of World War II an artificial desert was built there for the units of Erwin Rommel's Afrika Korps (the other such training ground was established in the Błędów Desert near Olkusz). At the same time the area became part of the so-called Pomeranian Wall, a line of almost 1000 concrete bunkers guarding the pre-war Polish-German border and eastern approaches to Berlin.

World War II

In September 1939 in the military barracks a German POW camp was established for Polish soldiers, and later also for Russian, French and Yugoslav POWs-Stalag 302. Later it became an Oflag II-D. 
After January 22, 1945, the Pomeranian Rampart lines of defences around Gross-Born were manned by local artillery school NCOs and local fighting for the area started. Actual engagements with the Polish Army and the Red Army started in early February and lasted for more than a month. The town however was located behind the lines and survived the war almost undamaged.

Soviet military base

After the war, the area of two military bases and the town itself was taken over by the Red Army. There the Soviet military established one of the biggest military camps of the Northern Group of Forces. The town was excluded from Polish jurisdiction and erased from all maps, even though officially part of the People's Republic of Poland. In official documents of the surrounding communes, the area of Borne Sulinowo and the surrounding 180 km² were called forest areas and remained a secret for almost 50 years.

Soviet withdrawal

Following the peaceful collapse of communism in Poland in 1989, an agreement was finally reached to withdraw the Soviet Army from Poland. The last of the large units, the 15,000 men strong 6th Guards Motor Rifle Division Vitebsk-Novgorod (later renamed the 166th Guards Motor Rifle Brigade of the Russian Federation) was withdrawn from Borne Sulinowo in October 1992. Poland regained full control of the town.

It was briefly controlled by the Polish Army, with a small contingent of the Polish 41st Mechanized Regiment stationed there. However, in April of the following year the Polish unit was withdrawn and the town was finally passed to civilian authorities – for the first time since the 19th century. On June 5, 1993, at 12 am, the town was officially opened to the public. On September 15 of the same year the Council of Ministers granted the town with a city charter and a process of settlement started. Among the first inhabitants of the town were Polish repatriates from Russian Siberia and Kazakhstan, who were finally allowed to return to Poland after more than 50 years of forcible resettlement in Soviet Union.

International Gathering of Military Vehicles

Since 2004, Borne Sulinowo has hosted the International Gathering of Military Vehicles. The event takes place over one weekend in August and has slowly grown into a general gathering of military enthusiasts and history buffs, with live concerts and cavalry shows for entertainment. The event offers attendees a chance to ride in a variety of vehicles, including tanks. Military surplus and historical items are sold in the bazaar. Many individuals choose to camp on-premises for the duration, and a large number wear military uniforms from different countries and time periods, World War II being the most popular.

International relations

Twin towns — Sister cities
Borne Sulinowo is twinned with:
Pszczyna, Ralsko, Krien

Image gallery

See also
 Oflag II-D
History of Poland (1945-1989)

References

External links
  Official Website
 Gallery of pictures

 The Bank of the Camp IID Gross Born
 

Cities and towns in West Pomeranian Voivodeship
Szczecinek County
Military history of Poland during World War II
Military installations of the Soviet Union in other countries
Populated lakeshore places in Poland

csb:Lëpa